Chontaul (Çontavul; , Çont-Evl) is a rural locality (a selo) in Kizilyurtovsky District, Republic of Dagestan, Russia. The population was 7,023 as of 2010. There are 63 streets.

Geography 
Chontaul is located on the left bank of the Sulak River, 87 km south of Kizlyar (the district's administrative centre) by road. Kostek and Novy Kostek are the nearest rural localities.

Nationalities 
Kumyks, Avars and Chechens live there.

References 

Rural localities in Kizilyurtovsky District